The young rider classification is one of the primary awards in the Vuelta a España cycling stage race. This classification is awarded based on the young rider with the lowest cumulative time (the same methodology as the general classification). The jersey is also awarded alongside the points and mountains classifications. In the 2017 and the 2018 editions, the winner only wore a red number bib as the white jersey was awarded to the winner of the Combination classification.

Winners

By nationality

References

Youth classification
Spanish sports trophies and awards